Carol Mary Bundy (August 26, 1942 – December 9, 2003) was an American serial killer. Bundy and Doug Clark became collectively known as the Sunset Strip Killers after being convicted of a series of murders in Los Angeles during the late spring and early summer.

Early life
Bundy had a troubled childhood, as both of her parents were abusive alcoholics. Bundy's mother died when she was young and her father sexually abused her starting at the age of 11. After Bundy's father remarried, he put her in various foster homes. When Bundy was 17 years old, she married a 56-year-old man. 

By the time Bundy met Doug Clark at the age of 37, she had just escaped a third marriage to an abusive man, by whom she had two young sons. She had begun an affair with her apartment block manager, part-time country singer Jack Murray, and had attempted to bribe Murray's wife into leaving him. After Murray's wife compelled him to evict Bundy from the block, Bundy continued to show up regularly to venues where he was singing. It was at one of these venues, a bar called Little Nashville, where she first met Clark in 1980. Clark soon moved in with Bundy and they found out that they shared dark sexual fantasies.

Murders
On August 9, 1980, the decomposed body of John Robert Murray, 45, was found in a van parked just blocks away from his home in Van Nuys. Murray's body suffered stab wounds to the chest and was decapitated. His head was never found. Two days later, Bundy called police and confessed to shooting her lover, John "Jack" Murray, with her chrome Raven gun, five days before his body was found.

On March 3, 1981, the skeleton of an unidentified prostitute was found buried in a shallow stream bed near the Bouquet Reservoir. Though only a few bones remained, investigators did recover a skull with a bullet hole. It was later revealed that Bundy confided in a fellow nurse about her involvement in the murder of the unidentified woman.

Arrest and Trial

Carol Bundy was arrested on August 11, 1980 at her home in Burbank. Two days later, she was arraigned for the murder of John Robert Murray and held without bail.

Sealed documents of a court session on September 18 of that year revealed that Bundy killed Murray in an effort to prevent him from going to authorities after she told him that her roommate, Douglas Clark, committed the Sunset slayings. She also told the court that she had to cut off his head to prevent the bullets being traced back to her. Co-workers of Bundy testified that she confessed to being present during one of the murders and helped dump the body afterwards.

On May 2, 1983, she pleaded guilty in Los Angeles County Superior Court to the murders of Murray in 1980 and an unidentified prostitute found in 1981. Her plea came as a surprise to prosecutors, as Bundy had originally pleaded not guilty and not guilty by reason of insanity. Though no bargain was made, by pleading guilty, the district attorney could not prove special circumstances; a requirement for life without the possibility of parole. Prosecutors had already agreed to remove the death penalty upon Bundy testifying against Clark during his trial.

On May 31, 1983, she was sentenced to 52 years to life; 27 years to life for the murder of Murray, and another 25 years to life, to be served consecutively, for assisting in the death of a prostitute.

She died in prison from heart failure on December 9, 2003, at the age of 61.

See also 
 List of serial killers in the United States
 Lust murder

References

Further reading

 Slater, David. ""It's Fun to Kill People!": The Sunset Strip Murders" in David Kerekes and David Slater (eds) Critical Vision: Random Essays & Tracts Concerning Sex Religion death Stockport Cheshire UK: Headpress, 1995, pp. 180–242. 

1942 births
1980 murders in the United States
2003 deaths
20th-century American criminals
American female serial killers
American people convicted of murder
American people who died in prison custody
American prisoners sentenced to life imprisonment
Crimes against sex workers in the United States
Criminals from Los Angeles
People convicted of murder by California
Prisoners sentenced to life imprisonment by California
Prisoners who died in California detention
Serial killers who died in prison custody
Violence against women in the United States